The Schichau-Werke (F. Schichau, Maschinen- und Lokomotivfabrik, Schiffswerft und Eisengießerei GmbH) was a German engineering works and shipyard based in Elbing, Germany (now Elbląg, Poland) on the Frisches Haff (Vistula Lagoon) of then-East Prussia. It also had a subsidiary shipyard in nearby Danzig (now: Gdańsk, Poland). Due to the Soviet conquest of eastern Germany, Schichau moved to Bremerhaven in March 1945, and its successors continued in business until 2009.

Early years
Ferdinand Schichau had studied engineering in Berlin, the Rheinland and Great Britain. In 1837, he founded the engineering institution, later known as F. Schichau GmbH, Maschinen- und Lokomotivfabrik (F. Schichau engineering and locomotive factory) in Elbing. It started with the production of hydraulic presses and diggers; in 1860, it began to produce locomotives for the Prussian Eastern Railway. From 1867 locomotive construction began in earnest, and three years later, the factory was connected to the railway network. In the early 20th century, the firm was one of several that built the Prussian P 8, the most numerous steam locomotive of its day.

Shipyards
From 1847, Schichau produced steam engines for ships, starting with the engine for the first entirely Prussian-built steamer James Watt (built by nearby Mitzlaff shipyard). In 1854, Schichau built the shipyard at Elbing, known as the Elbinger Dampfschiffs-Reederei F. Schichau ('Elbing Steamship Shipping Company F. Schichau'). The first ship launched was the small steamer Borussia in 1855 – the first Prussian iron propeller ship. The shipyard was subsequently expanded, and in 1872 Schichau acquired Mitzlaff's yard.

From 1877 the shipyard produced ships for the Prussian Navy and export, becoming specialized in torpedo boats and later destroyers. It became a major manufacturer of torpedo boats for the Prussian Navy. The engine of S 1, which was built by Schichau in 1884 as one of Germany's first torpedo boats, is shown on display in the Deutsches Museum in Munich today.

Since the shipyard's location on the Elbing River limited the size of ships that could be constructed, in 1892 Schichau built a second shipyard in Danzig, which was capable of producing bigger warships, up to battleship size, as well as freighters and passenger ships. Both shipyards also built ships for export worldwide, especially torpedo boats. In 1889 Schichau built a small repair shipyard in Pillau (now Baltijsk, Russia) near Königsberg (now Kaliningrad, Russia). Schichau's son-in-law, Carl Heinz Ziese, worked at Schichau-Werke and continued to run the business after Schichau's death in 1896, until 1917.

Interwar years
When Ziese died in 1917, the management of the company passed to the husband of his only daughter, Hildegard, the Swede Carl Carlson. After his death, Hildegard Carlson ran the firm. After World War I, the shipyard was threatened with bankruptcy and in 1929 it was bought by the German government. In 1930, the company bought a small yard in Königsberg.

After the First World War, the Schichau works, together with the Union-Giesserei in Königsberg (that they later took over), was encouraged to focus on locomotive building with the aid of government subsidies known as Osthilfe ("Eastern Aid"). During the Second World War, the firm of Borsig placed several contracts with the Schichau-Werke in Elbing, that continued production until January 1945.

WWII years
During World War II (in 1941-1944) F. Schicau was operator of Nobel & Lessner shipyard in Tallinn.

U-boat production
During World War II, Schichau built 94 U-boats for the Kriegsmarine (German Navy) at its Danzig shipyard. The yard in Elbing produced midget submarines of the Seehund class. In addition to the manufacture of Type VII C submarines, the shipyard in Danzig also built the revolutionary Type XXI U-boats. Up to 1944, 62 Type VII C U-boats (and two Type VII C/41s) were built, before production was switched to the Type XXI. A total of 30 submarines of this latter class were built and launched at Danzig by the end of the war, but never saw combat.

Forced labor
During World War II prisoners from Poland, France, the Netherlands, Lithuania, Latvia, Germany and Hungary were transported from satellite camps of Stutthof concentration camp near Danzig to work  at Schichau. The prisoners received inadequate rations: half a litre of thin soup and 250 grams of bread per day. There was no winter clothing. Many of these forced laborers died as a result of epidemics, accidents, and beatings by the guards. Bodies were burned in a crematorium but also buried in mass graves at the cemetery in Saspe (now the Zaspa district of Gdańsk).

Locomotive production

Up to the end of the war in 1945, the Schichau-Werke had supplied about 4,300 locomotives of several classes to customers that included the Deutsche Reichsbahn and GEDOB formed from disbanded Polish State Railways. These included the DRG and DRB standard steam locomotive (Einheitsdampflokomotive) classes 23, 41, and DRB Class 52 Kriegslokomotive. as well as DRG Class 86. The Schichau-Werke also designed the Class 24 and delivered its first two orders.

After the war, the shipyards were acquired by Poland – to which the region was assigned by border changes promulgated at the Potsdam Conference. Postwar production included ships, railcars and boilers. The Schichau shipyard at Danzig was subsumed into the Lenin shipyard in 1950 and, in 1980, attracted worldwide media coverage as a result of protests led by the Solidarność trade union.

Recent history
In early 1945, Schichau transferred a floating dock Flender Werke in Lübeck. In March 1945, as Soviet forces approached, Hermann Noë, the chief executive, and some employees fled Danzig with uncompleted ships to Bremerhaven. In April Noë founded there a new Schichau company. In the early postwar years, the company repaired machinery, agricultural engines, locomotives and trams. After the Western Allies lifted the ban on shipbuilding in West Germany in 1951, Schichau reopened its shipyard in Bremerhaven.

Schichau later was merged into Schichau Seebeckwerft, in Bremerhaven, which continued in business until 2009. In July 1945, the company's former Königsberg site became  the Soviet (now Russian) Yantar Shipyard.

Ships built by Schichau (selection)

Civilian ships
 Arayat (1931), Commonwealth of the Philippines customs inspection and enforcement cutter, sunk December 1941, refloated by Imperial Japanese Navy as patrol boat No. 105
 Banahao (1930), Commonwealth of the Philippines lighthouse tender, sunk December 1941
 Columbus (1922), then 
  (1927), Turkish passenger ferry, sank in 1958
 Canlaon (1930), Commonwealth of the Philippines  lighthouse tender, sunk December 1941

Naval ships

Battleships
 
 : Launched 6 January 1901
 s
 : Launched 26 May 1903
 : Launched 27 May 1904
 
 : Launched 30 June 1910
 
 :  Launched 27 April 1912
 
 :  Launched 30 October 1915

Battlecruisers
 
 : Launched 29 November 1913
 
 : Launched 15 September 1917

Submarines (U-boats)
 64 Type VII submarines (1939–1944)
 30 Type XXI submarines (1943–1945)

Großes Torpedoboot 1913 class Torpedo Boats

Großes Torpedoboot 1916 class Torpedo Boats

Torpedoboot 1935
 6 x Torpedoboot 1935

Torpedoboot 1937
 9 x Torpedoboot 1937

Flottentorpoedoboot 1939
 15 x Flottentorpedoboot 1939

Flottentorpedoboot 1941
 15 x Flottentorpedoboot 1941 (construction started, non of them where finished before the end of the war)

Foreign Navies
 Novik (Russian cruiser)
 USS Somers (torpedo boat)
 NMS Trotușul (torpedo boat)

Schichau-built ships still afloat 
 Stralsund (built in 1890), small railway ferry, Wolgast, Germany
 Jacob Langeberg, ex von Bötticher (built in 1902), tug and icebreaker, originally used on the Kiel Canal, today in Wormerveer, Netherlands
Sabine, formerly Berby, formerly Aegir, built Elbing 1895 yard no, 562 . Inspection vessel for Kaiserliche Canalbau-Commission 90 hp single. Today berthed in Deptford Creek, London.

References

Sources
 Werkbahn: Schichau Werke
 Important busts in the memorial hall of the Deutsches Museum, including Ferdinand Schichau
 F.Schichau developed a steamship engine with triple-expansion

External links
 

Defunct locomotive manufacturers of Germany
Shipbuilding companies of Germany
Companies based in Gdańsk
Companies of Prussia